Heat Wave (Mick Rory) is a supervillain  appearing in comic books published by DC Comics, commonly as an enemy of The Flash and a member of The Rogues along with Captain Cold.

Actor Dominic Purcell has portrayed the character in The CW's Arrowverse television series The Flash and starred on Legends of Tomorrow until the sixth season.

Publication history 
Heat Wave was first introduced in The Flash #140, written by John Broome. He was first made to be a rival for Captain Cold. However, in recent comics by Geoff Johns, Rory looks to Captain Cold to help him keep his obsession at bay, though Cold thinks he'll eventually become beyond help.

Fictional character biography 

Born on a farm outside Central City, Mick Rory became fascinated with fire as a child.  This fascination turned into an obsession and one night, he set his family's home ablaze. His obsession was so great, that he simply watched the flames engulf his house, instead of running to get help.

After this event, Rory went to live with his uncle. His pyromania continued and he was forced to run away after locking a schoolmate in his house and setting it on fire, after the boy locked Rory in a meat locker during a field trip. He took a job as a fire eater with a traveling circus. This did not last long either, as he ended up setting the circus on fire. He has an intense fear of cold, called cryophobia. This was due to a school field trip (noted above) to a slaughterhouse, during which one of his friends locked him in a freezer.

It was these events that made him desperate to fight his fire obsession and after seeing the Rogues in action in Central City, he decided to use his mania to become a villain. He created a protective costume made of asbestos (this was back before the dangers of asbestos were known), built a gun-sized flamethrower (nicknamed the "Hot Rod"), and became Heat Wave. As he was committing crimes in Central City, it was inevitable that he would run into the Flash, which he did quite regularly. Subsequently, he also ended up in jail quite regularly. He also became an adversary of Captain Cold, due to his aversion to cold temperatures. It was Captain Cold who introduced Heat Wave to the Rogues, and in his first appearance they teamed up to get rid of the Flash as they competed over a newscaster they had both fallen in love with and fought each other as they each tried to complete a larger crime spree, but the Flash jailed them both.

Eventually, Mick went straight, due largely to the manipulations of the Top. He took a job as a firefighting consultant, using his vast knowledge on fires and heat. He also became good friends with Barry Allen, whose secret identity as Flash was discovered by Rory years before. Rory later succumbed to an offer by Abra Kadabra of gaining respect and infamy in the world. He and four other members of the Rogues sacrificed themselves, quite unwittingly, to unleash the demon Neron.

Neron returned the soulless bodies of the five to Earth, in a plan to force Flash into a deal. The five Rogues each possessed incredible powers and wreaked havoc, death, and destruction before Neron was forced by Flash to halt their actions and return their souls to their bodies.

Heat Wave would only briefly return to his criminal ways before abandoning them to study with Zhutanian monks. Afterwards, he worked for Project Cadmus as a backup agent, but eventually quit that too and moved to the Quad Cities, Illinois area. He eventually got a job at the FBI, along with other reformed members of the Rogues. This was a spectacular failure and Rory became a villain once again after the Top arrived and undid the mental program that had kept him reformed.

In Infinite Crisis, Heat Wave became a member of the Secret Society of Super Villains.

One Year Later 
In One Year Later, Heat Wave is next seen being recruited by Inertia to team up against Bart Allen. He is one of the rogues who deliver the killing blow to Bart. He freaks out about what he and the Rogues have done and flees only to be captured by Captain Boomerang alongside Weather Wizard. He is sent to "hell planet" Salvation with the other Rogues. When the conflict starts, he sides with Luthor. When they beat J'onn, he's worried about killing another hero, claiming that they will kill them with rusty razors. He returns to Earth with the villains who are still alive.

Salvation Run 
Heat Wave is one of the exiled villains featured in Salvation Run along with his fellow Rogues: Captain Cold, Weather Wizard, Mirror Master, and Abra Kadabra.

Final Crisis: Rogues' Revenge 
He was seen as the member of Rogues who joined Libra's Secret Society of Super Villains. In Final Crisis: Rogues' Revenge #1, however, Heat Wave and the rest of the Rogues reject Libra's offer, wanting to stay out of the game. Before they can retire, they hear of Inertia escaping and decide to stick around long enough to get revenge for being used, particularly after they find that Paul Gambi, the Rogues' tailor, has been badly beaten by the 'New Rogues' organised by Libra. During the hunt for Inertia, Heat Wave also kills Burn- his own counterpart in the 'New Rogues'- when the two shoot their weapons at each other, Heat Wave noting that Burn's costume was of poorer quality than his own, allowing him to burn Burn to death while he is barely sweating while subjected to Burn's own weapons. Captain Cold later has him kill Cold's father, abducted by Libra as a hostage against Cold. While Libra tries to hypnotize the Rogues, Captain Cold tells Rory to watch a nearby fire to retain his focus. When they are fighting Inertia, Rory melts his boots, making him unable to move. He then helps the other Rogues kill Inertia.

Once the crisis is over, the unarmed Human Flame seeks out Heat Wave, hoping to purchase one of his signature flamethrower guns after his own equipment was lost in a confrontation with the Mafia. After learning that the Human Flame can only offer him $5 000, Heat Wave refuses, denouncing Human Flame as "pathetic". Noting that Captain Cold advised against this meeting and he only agreed to see what the other man had to offer, Heat Wave gives Human Flame a harsh beating, the fight concluding with Heat Wave blowing up the fireworks factory they were meeting in, noting that he had always wanted to do something like that.

The Flash (vol. 3) 
Heat Wave and the Rogues visit Sam Scudder's old hideout and unveil a giant mirror with the words In Case of Flash: Break Glass written on it. Rory is still on the run with The Rogues.

The New 52 
In September 2011, The New 52 rebooted DC's continuity. In this timeline, Heat Wave is now able to shoot fire from his chest, and has issues with Captain Cold, blaming him for the breakup of the Rogues. Both villains end up being defeated by the Flash, but upon being incarcerated they meet with Cold's sister Golden Glider who recruits him for an unknown plot.

DC Rebirth 
In the Watchmen sequel Doomsday Clock, Heat Wave and his fellow Rogues are among the villains that attend the underground meeting held by Riddler to talk about the Superman Theory.

Powers and abilities

Pre-52 
In the Pre-52 continuity Heat Wave had no meta-human abilities; however, he was able to create a flamethrower that allowed him to project intense streams of flame that reach temperatures well over 900 degrees Fahrenheit. The flame that his weaponry projects is so hot that it has been able to melt Flash's friction proof boots, the same boots that allow Flash to run at light speed. He also has an in-depth knowledge of fire and pyrotechnics.

New 52 
In the New 52 continuity, Heat Wave merged his DNA with his flamethrower, thus granting him the ability to project and manipulate fire from his own body.

Weapons & Equipment 
Heat Wave carries a hand held flamethrower that allows him to project a concentrated stream of fire at opponents. He wears an asbestos suit with a breathing mask that affords him protection against fire and heat. His suit was once shown to be able to project heat as well, capable of staving off an attack from Captain Cold's cold gun, neutralizing solid projectiles, or melting his way through walls. Heat Wave has a pipe attached to his left arm that can project a fire retardant which allows him to put out fires.

Other versions

Tangent Comics 
In Tangent Comics (now Earth-9 of the DC Multiverse) Heat Wave is mentioned as New York's weather-manipulating villain that was defeated by Superman.

JLA/Avengers 
In JLA/Avengers Heat Wave is among the villains enthralled by Krona to defend his base in #4. He is shown blasting Jocasta.

New Rogues
The New Rogues version of Heat Wave is Burn, a unknown man who possesses a heat gun. This one was actually Nightwing's "Freddy Dinardo" alias in disguise.

Flashpoint 
In the alternate timeline of the Flashpoint event, Heat Wave kills Jason Rusch in an attempt to take his place in the Firestorm Matrix, but is defeated by Cyborg. He is then sent to death row in the military Doom prison. During this time, Eel O'Brian arrives to break him out, having been hiding in the body of his cellmate Cluemaster. During the prison break, Heat Wave forces an inmate to join him, after taking out another inmate Victor Zsasz and the corrections officer Atom, who controls the actions of Amazo. While retrieving his weapons, Heat Wave then attacks the guards' control room and attempts to ram Cyborg's home city of Detroit with the Doom prison. Heat Wave then betrays O'Brian and apparently kills him with his flamethrower. Cyborg arrives and moves the Doom prison away from the city with his sonic weapon. When the Doom prison crashes, Heat Wave attempts to escape, but Cyborg challenges him to a fight. During the fight, Cyborg manages to defeat Heat Wave and the inmates are willing to surrender. Later, Heat Wave is imprisoned in Belle Reve with his new cellmate, when O'Brian is revealed to be alive in his new cellmate's body and gets revenge on him at the end of the page.

25th Century Heat Wave 
A futuristic version Heatstroke is a heroic Heat Wave as part of the 25th Century cops known as The Renegades from Professor Zoom's future.

Earth-3 
At the time when the "Forever Evil" storyline was happening, Grid access the files of Rhonda Pineda where the Earth-3 version of Mick Rory was a police officer alongside Leonard Snart where they have been pursuing Jonathan Allen and Rhonda. When Jonathan and Rhonda wanted the two of them to fight to the death upon being captured, Mick won the fight only for him to be killed by Jonathan anyway.

In other media

Television

Animation
 Heat Wave was originally going to appear in Challenge of the Superfriends as a member of the League of Evil before the group was changed to the Legion of Doom and Heat Wave, among others, was cut from the series.
 Heat Wave appears in Justice League Unlimited, voiced by Lex Lang. This version is a member of Gorilla Grodd's Secret Society. Prior to and during the events of the episodes "Alive!" and "Destroyer", Lex Luthor takes over the Society, but Grodd launches a mutiny to retake command. In the ensuing battle between those with Luthor and those with Grodd, Heat Wave sides with the former before Darkseid attacks and kills most of them. Luthor, Heatwave, and the other survivors subsequently join forces with the Justice League to repel Darkseid's invasion of Earth.
 Heat Wave appears in the Batman: The Brave and the Bold episode "Requiem for a Scarlet Speedster!", voiced by Steve Blum.

Arrowverse

Mick Rory / Heat Wave appears in media set in The CW's Arrowverse, portrayed by Dominic Purcell. This version is a pyromaniac with burns covering half of his body.
 First appearing in The Flash, he receives an experimental "heat gun" and reluctantly joins his ex-partner Leonard Snart and the latter's sister Lisa Snart in forming the Rogues and battling the Flash across the first and second seasons.
 Rory also appears in Legends of Tomorrow, in which Rip Hunter recruits him and Leonard, among others, to form the Legends and stop Vandal Savage from conquering the world. In the first season, Rory betrays the team and is abandoned by Leonard in an unspecified location, where the Time Masters take him in and turn him into their personal bounty hunter Chronos. Rory hunts his former teammates until they defeat and eventually rehabilitate him before he rejoins the Legends to help them kill the Time Masters. In the second season, Rory is manipulated into joining the Legion of Doom, but he regrets his decision and helps the Legends defeat the Legion. In the third through sixth seasons, Rory encounters a past version of his abusive father Dick Rory, discovers a talent for writing, becomes a semi-popular romance novelist under the pen name "Rebecca Silver", accidentally conceives a daughter with his old high school girlfriend Ali, attempts to care for his daughter Lita, hands off his authorial work to teammate Mona Wu, gets impregnated by the Necrian Kayla, gives birth to 48 alien hybrid offspring, and departs the Legends to care for them.
 Additionally, Mitchell Kummen portrays a young Rory in the episode "Last Refuge".
 An alternate universe incarnation of Rory appears in the crossover "Crisis on Infinite Earths". This version is a former member of the Legends after most of them retired and one died.

Film
Heat Wave makes a non-speaking appearance in Justice League: The Flashpoint Paradox. This version is a member of the Rogues.

Video games
 Heat Wave appears in the NES version of Batman: The Video Game.
 Heat Wave appears in Batman: The Brave and the Bold – The Videogame, voiced again by Steve Blum.
 Heat Wave appears in DC Universe Online, voiced by David Jennison. This version works as a tech-based arms dealer in the Hall of Doom.
 Heat Wave appears as a playable character in DC Unchained.

Lego
 Heat Wave appears as a playable character in Lego Batman 3: Beyond Gotham, voiced by Robin Atkin Downes.
 Heat Wave appears in Lego DC Super-Villains, voiced by Lex Lang. This version is a member of the Legion of Doom.

Miscellaneous
 Heat Wave appears in issue #21 of the Justice League Unlimited tie-in comic book series, in which he enters a relationship with Killer Frost.
 Heat Waves appears in the Injustice: Gods Among Us prequel comic as a member of the Rogues, who work with Batman's Insurgency to cripple Superman's Regime. While destroying several Regime bases, the Rogues are attacked by Bizarro, who kills Heat Wave.

References

External links 
 Alan Kistler's Profile On: THE FLASH Part 1 and Part 2 – A detailed analysis of the history of the Flash by comic book historian Alan Kistler. Covers information all the way from Jay Garrick to Barry Allen to today, as well as discussions on the various villains and Rogues who fought the Flash. Various art scans.

Comics characters introduced in 1963
Characters created by John Broome
Fictional murderers
DC Comics television characters
DC Comics supervillains
DC Comics superheroes
DC Comics metahumans
Characters created by Carmine Infantino
Fictional characters with fire or heat abilities
Flash (comics) characters